Daisy Ehanire Danjuma (born 6 August 1952) is a Nigerian politician who was the senator representing the Edo South Senatorial District of Edo State at the Nigerian Senate from 2003 to 2007. She also re-contested during the Nigeria general election in 2011 but was unsuccessful.

Early life 
Daisy Ehanire Danjuma was born on the 6th of August 1952 in Benin City, Edo State, Nigeria.

Education and career 
Danjuma attended government secondary school in Benin city, Edo state, before studying at Ahmadu Bello University, Zaria, where she graduated with a BA in Law in 1976. In 1977, she was called to the Nigerian Bar as a practising lawyer. Danjuma undertook her national service in the NYSC as a State Counsel with the Ministry of Justice of Lagos State, and was a legal counsel to the Legal Aid Council of Nigeria. She worked as an Executive Assistant at Nigerian Acceptances Limited (NAL), a Merchant Bank, from 1977 to 1978. She was Company Secretary/Legal Adviser to the Nigerian Television Authority (NTA) from 1982 to 1992. Danjuma was elected Senator of the Federal Republic of Nigeria (2003-2007) representing Edo South.

Politics 
In the 2003 Nigerian parliamentary election, Danjuma was elected senator to represent Edo South constituency of Edo State at the Nigerian National Assembly from 2003 to 2007 under the Action Congress Party (AC). As a senator she served as the Chairman, Senate Committee on Women Affairs and Youth Development, Member, Senate Committees on Health, Education, Finance and Land Transport of the National Assembly. Being a senator from Nigeria gave Danjuma the opportunity to be a member of the Commonwealth Parliamentary Association (CPA). She has also served as Chairman, Women and Child Right Committee of the Economic Community of West African States (ECOWAS Parliament). Danjuma contested for second tenure for her senate office during the 2011 Nigeria general election but was unsuccessful and defeated by Ehigie Edobor Uzumere with a margin of almost double of her votes; by 135,346 votes to 70,725. And this shows Uzamere successfully for reelection in the April 2011 elections for the Edo South Senatorial District. 
After a series of appeals, in June 2009, the court of appeal ruled that Uzamere had in fact been duly elected.

Personal life 
Danjuma is married to the former Nigerian military general and minister of defence of Nigeria, Theophilus Yakubu Danjuma founder of the oil exploration company, South Atlantic Petroleum. Together they have one child.

Awards  
Women4Africa Award

References

External links 

Living people
Members of the Senate (Nigeria)
Nigerian women business executives
Edo State politicians
21st-century Nigerian politicians
Nigerian women in politics
1952 births
Ahmadu Bello University alumni
Danjuma family